Cynthia A. Darlow (born June 13, 1949) is an American actress.

Education
Darlow graduated from Hampton High School in 1967 and the University of North Carolina School of the Arts in 1970.

Career
For five seasons, Darlow was an ensemble player and announcer on the children's educational series Square One Television. On television, she has made numerous appearances in three of the different Law & Order series, and guest starred on Soul Man and The Sopranos. In 1990, she played the part of Marge in Sesame Street Home Video Visits the Firehouse. In 2017, Darlow began playing the recurring role of Mrs. Moskowitz on the Amazon Prime comedy-drama series The Marvelous Mrs. Maisel.

Her film credits include The Thomas Crown Affair (1999), Lost Souls (2000) and 25th Hour (2002).

Darlow has many on- and off-Broadway credits, including Grease, Prelude to a Kiss, Rumors, Taller Than a Dwarf and Trouble in Paradise. Darlow is a member of the New York-based Actors Company Theatre (TACT).

Personal life
Married to Philip Myers Reid, May 30, 1970 in Greensboro, NC. Darlow was formerly married to Ralph J. Erenzo and is currently married to audiobook narrator Richard Ferrone.

References

External links

Cynthia Darlow's Facebook page
Audiofile Magazine Narrator Profile of Cynthia Darlow
University of North Carolina School of the Arts

1949 births
American film actresses
American television actresses
Living people
University of North Carolina School of the Arts alumni
21st-century American women